In statistics, the knockoff filter, or simply knockoffs, is a framework for variable selection. It was originally introduced for linear regression by Rina Barber and Emmanuel Candès, and later generalized to other regression models in the random design setting. Knockoffs has found application in many practical areas, notably in genome-wide association studies.

Fixed-X knockoffs 
Consider a linear regression model with response vector  and feature matrix , which is treated as deterministic. Barber and Candès showed that, equipped with a suitable feature importance statistic, fixed-X knockoffs can be used for variable selection while controlling the false discovery rate (FDR).

Model-X knockoffs 
Consider a general regression model with response vector  and random feature matrix . A matrix  is said to be knockoffs of  if it is conditionally independent of  given  and satisfies a subtle pairwise exchangeable condition: for any , the joint distribution of the random matrix  does not change if its th and th columns are swapped, where  is the number of features. While it is less clear how to create model-X knockoffs compared to their fixed-X counterpart, various algorithms have been proposed to construct knockoffs. Once constructed, model-X knockoffs can be used for variable selection following the same procedure as fixed-X knockoffs and control the FDR.

Properties 
The knockoffs  can be understood as negative controls. Mathematically, the exchangeability conditions translate to symmetry that allows for an estimation of the type I error (e.g., if one wishes to choose the FDR as the type I error rate, the false discovery proportion is estimated), which then leads to exact type I error control.

Model-X knockoffs provides valid type I error control regardless of the unknown conditional distribution of  given , and it can work with black-box variable importance statistics, including the ones derived from complicated machine learning methods. This knowledge can be gained with the help of unlabeled data.

References

External links 

 Official website

 Regression analysis